Cynthia Jessenia Calderón Ulloa is a beauty queen who represented Peru in Miss World 2007 in China.

Miss World 2007
Calderon was the first Peruvian women to past in 2 Fast Track Awards: The Miss World Beach Beauty, when she placed 13th; and The Miss World Top Model, when she placed 13th.

References

Miss World 2007 delegates
1988 births
Living people
Peruvian female models
Peruvian beauty pageant winners